Alfred McCray (May 2, 1881 – May 20, 1928) was an American football and basketball coach, a college football referee and common pleas court judge in Ohio during the early 20th century.

Football playing career
McCray played college football at the University of Cincinnati from 1902 to 1904, serving as team captain during his senior season

College coaching career

Marshall
McCray served as the head football coach at Marshall University in Huntington, West Virginia in 1905, leading the team to an 6–2 record.

Antioch College
McCray served as the head football coach at Antioch College in Yellow Springs, Ohio in 1909.

University of Dayton
McCray coached the football team (1914–1916) and basketball (1915–1917) at the University of Dayton.

Officiating
McCray served as an National Collegiate Athletic Association-registered official during the 1915 college football season.

Legal career
McCray served as a Judge of Common Pleas in Dayton, Ohio until his death in 1928.

Head coaching record

Football

References

External links
 

1881 births
1928 deaths
20th-century American judges
College football officials
Cincinnati Bearcats football players
Dayton Flyers football coaches
Dayton Flyers men's basketball coaches
Marshall Thundering Herd football coaches
Sportspeople from Warren, Ohio
Coaches of American football from Ohio
Players of American football from Ohio
Basketball coaches from Ohio